Pedro Henrique Nunes, also known as Pedro Enrique (born 22 August 1988, in São Paulo) is a Brazilian racing driver.

Career

Formula Three Sudamericana
Nunes drove in the Formula Three Sudamericana championship from 2006 to 2008, finishing as runner-up in his final year in the category.

Formula Renault
In 2006, Nunes also drove at selected races in the Brazilian Formula Renault series. In 2007, he drove in twenty races overall in Eurocup Formula Renault 2.0 and Formula Renault 2.0 Northern European Cup for SL Formula Racing.

Formula Three Euroseries
For 2009 he moved to the Formula Three Euroseries for Manor Motorsport, finishing 27th in the championship. He also appeared as a guest driver at the Autódromo Internacional do Algarve in Portimão in British Formula 3.

GP3 Series
2010 saw Nunes move to the GP3 Series, competing for ART Grand Prix. He joined Esteban Gutiérrez and Alexander Rossi at the team.

He stayed in the series for 2011 alongside Valtteri Bottas and James Calado until he was replaced by Richie Stanaway at the Spa

Racing record

Career summary

† – As Nunes was a guest driver, he was ineligible to score points.

Complete GP3 Series results
(key) (Races in bold indicate pole position) (Races in italics indicate fastest lap)

† Was classified despite not finishing the race.

References

External links
 Official website
 Nunes career statistics at Driver Database

1988 births
Living people
Racing drivers from São Paulo
Brazilian racing drivers
Stock Car Brasil drivers
Formula Renault 2.0 NEC drivers
Formula Renault Eurocup drivers
Brazilian Formula Renault 2.0 drivers
Formula 3 Sudamericana drivers
British Formula Three Championship drivers
Formula 3 Euro Series drivers
Brazilian GP3 Series drivers
Manor Motorsport drivers
ART Grand Prix drivers
Piquet GP drivers
Hitech Grand Prix drivers